Yegor Viktorovych Dementyev (born 12 March 1987 in Kremenchuk) is a Ukrainian cyclist, who currently rides for UCI Continental team .

As he was born with one arm shorter than the other, Dementyev is eligible to compete in the Paralympic Games. He won multiple gold medals for Ukraine at the 2012 Summer Paralympics.

Major results

2009
 1st  Road race, National Under-23 Road Championships
 3rd Trofeo Gianfranco Bianchin
 6th Tallinn–Tartu GP
2010
 1st  National Criterium Championships
 4th Overall Grand Prix of Adygeya
 9th Grand Prix of Donetsk
2011
 3rd Overall Tour of Gallipoli
 10th Overall Tour of Alanya
2017
 1st Minsk Cup
 2nd Horizon Park Classic
 4th Overall Five Rings of Moscow
 7th Overall Tour of Mersin
 8th Horizon Park Race Maidan
2018
 1st Stage 1 Tour of Szeklerland
 2nd Horizon Park Race for Peace
 8th Horizon Park Classic
2019
 3rd Horizon Park Race for Peace
 4th Horizon Park Classic

References

External links

Paralympic gold medalists for Ukraine
Paralympic cyclists of Ukraine
Cyclists at the 2012 Summer Paralympics
People from Kremenchuk
1987 births
Ukrainian male cyclists
Living people
Medalists at the 2012 Summer Paralympics
Cyclists at the 2020 Summer Paralympics
Medalists at the 2020 Summer Paralympics
Paralympic bronze medalists for Ukraine
Paralympic medalists in cycling
Sportspeople from Poltava Oblast
21st-century Ukrainian people